Musik aus dem Schattenreich is the debut studio album of Nekropolis, released in 1979 by Nekropolis.

Track listing

Personnel
Adapted from the Musik aus dem Schattenreich liner notes.
 Peter Frohmader – electronics, electric guitar, electric bass guitar, double bass, fretless bass guitar
 Rudi Neuber – drums

Release history

References

External links 
 

1979 debut albums
Nekropolis albums